The Serrano are an indigenous people of California.  They use the autonyms of Taaqtam, meaning "people"; Maarrênga’yam, "people from Morongo"; and Yuhaaviatam, "people of the pines." Today the Maarrênga'yam are enrolled in the Morongo Band of Mission Indians, and the Yuhaviatam are enrolled in the San Manuel Band of Mission Indians. Additionally, some Serrano people are enrolled in the Soboba Band of Luiseno Indians.

The Serrano historically lived in the San Bernardino Mountains and other Transverse Ranges, and in the southern Mojave Desert, within Southern California.

Serrano language is part of the Takic subset of the large Uto-Aztecan languages group of indigenous people of North America. The language family historically extended from Mexico along the West Coast and into the Great Basin, with representation among tribes in Mesoamerica.  They were a branch of the Takic languages speaking people who arrived in Southern California around 2,500 years ago.  Serrano means "highlander" or "mountaineer" in Spanish. When the Spanish missionaries came into the region, in the late 18th century they helped create the tribal name Serrano, distinguishing the people from neighboring tribes who were designated as the Tongva (Gabrileño—Fernandeño) to the northwest, and Kitanemuk and Tataviam to the northwest.

The Spanish founded Mission San Gabriel Arcangel in 1771, south of the San Gabriel Mountains and southwest of the San Bernardino Mountains. With the establishment of the mission, the Serrano lands claimed by the Spanish came under the jurisdiction of the mission and its subsequent outposts, or asistencias, in particular the San Bernardino de Sena Estancia, established in 1819. With the Cahuilla and Quechan tribes, in 1812 the Serrano revolted against it and other local missions practicing Indian reductions. 

In 1834 the Mexican Alta California government forcibly relocated many Serrano to the missions.  They suffered devastating smallpox outbreaks in 1840 and 1860.

In 1867 the Yuhaviatam band of Serrano were the victims of a massacre conducted by American settlers of the San Bernardino Valley, during a 32-day campaign at Chimney Rock. The massacre was a response to a raid, probably carried out by Chemehuevi Southern Paiutes, on a white settlement at Lake Arrowhead, during which buildings were burned. Three American ranch hands were killed at a ranch called Los Flores in Summit Valley, near present-day Hesperia. Tribal leader Santos Manuel led the survivors from the mountains to the valley, where they established permanent residence adjacent to the hot springs near present-day Highland.

In 1891 the United States established the San Manuel Reservation for the Serrano people, which took its name to honor of Chief Santos Manuel.

The Serrano historically lived in the San Bernardino Mountains and into the San Bernardino Valley,  and later extended northwest through east into the Mojave Desert, and west into the San Gabriel Mountains, the Sierra Pelona Mountains, and the southern Tehachapi Mountains.

The Serrano populated the San Bernardino Mountains and extended northwest into the Mojave River area of the Mojave Desert and west into the Tejon Creek watershed in the Tehachapi Mountains. The Serrano populations along Tejon Creek were identified as the Cuahajai or Cuabajay, their exonyms by the neighboring Mojave tribe. Mountain camps were used for hunting. One such encampment was accidentally unearthed by the U.S. Forest Service fighting a wildfire in 2003 near Baldwin Lake. Uncovered were artifacts of non-local jasper and obsidian, ash and charcoal, grinding stones, and fire pits possibly dating back 1,000 years.

Serrano villages included Akxawiet, Cucamonga, Homhoabit, Jurumpa, Juyubit, Muscupiabit, Topapaibit (Victorville), Guapiabit (Hesperia), Paso del Cajon, San Benito, San Gorgonio, San Pascual, (Rancho) San Timoteo, Temeku (Rancheria), Tolocabi, and Yucaipa.

Population

Estimates have varied as scholars struggle to determine the pre-contact populations of most native groups in California. (See Population of Native California.) Alfred L. Kroeber  put the combined 1770 population of the Serrano, Kitanemuk, and Tataviam at 3,500 and the Serrano proper (excluding the Vanyume) at 1,500. Lowell John Bean suggested an aboriginal Serrano population of about 2,500.

As noted, smallpox epidemics and social disruption reduced the population. The 1880 census reported only 381 Serranos, a number Helen Hunt Jackson thought was too low as it did not account for those who were living in remote areas. Kroeber estimated the combined population of the Serrano, Kitanemuk, and Tataviam in 1910 as 150.

Reservations
The Morongo Reservation in Banning, California, and the San Manuel Reservation near San Bernardino, California, are both federally recognized Indian reservations belonging to the Serrano people.

See also
 The Eye of God, sacred site in Big Bear City, CA
 Serrano language
 Serrano traditional narratives
 Juyubit, California (Serrano settlement)

Notes

References
 Bean, Lowell John, and Charles R. Smith. (1978), "Serrano", in California, edited by Robert F. Heizer, pp. 570–574. Handbook of North American Indians, William C. Sturtevant, general editor, vol. 8. Smithsonian Institution, Washington, D.C.
 Kroeber, A. L. (1925), Handbook of the Indians of California. Bureau of American Ethnology Bulletin No. 78. Washington, D.C.
 Pritzker, Barry M.  A Native American Encyclopedia: History, Culture, and Peoples. Oxford: Oxford University Press, 2000.

External links

San Manuel Band of Mission Indians
Morongo Band of Mission Indians
Mojave Desert Net: Serrano Indians

 
Native American tribes in California
California Mission Indians
History of Los Angeles County, California
History of San Bernardino County, California
History of the Mojave Desert region
San Bernardino Mountains
San Gabriel Mountains
Tehachapi Mountains